Maco Tevane, real name Marc Maamaatuaiahutapu (13 August 1937 – 21 August 2013) was a French Polynesian author, playwright, and politician who served as Minister of Culture in the government of Gaston Flosse in the 1990s. He was a defender of Polynesian culture and the Tahitian language and is considered the founding father of popular Tahitian theatre. He was the father of politician Heremoana Maamaatuaiahutapu  and TNTV director Mateata Maamaatuaiahutapu.

Early life
After graduating from high school with a national diploma he worked as a surveyor  for the land registry before working for the lands service. After gaining a qualification in teaching Tahitian he worked as a court interpreter and then for the Office de Radiodiffusion Télévision Française as a television host.

In August 1972 he founded the Tahitian Academy. In 1974 he was one of its first academic members. In 1979 he created the Artistic Conservatory of French Polynesia to promote traditional arts and culture.

Political career
In October 1966 Tevane was elected as a municipal councillor in Papeete. From 1972 to 1982 he worked as an advisor to the French Polynesian government. He frequently represented French Polynesia at meetings of the South Pacific Commission.

He stood unsuccessfully for the National Assembly in the 1978 French legislative election, losing to Gaston Flosse. He ran again in the 1981 election, but gained only 3.9% of the vote. Shortly before the 1982 French Polynesian legislative election he founded the Social Democrat party with Frantz Vanizette, but gained only 2.8% of the vote.

In September 1991 he was appointed Minister of Social Affairs, Employment, and Labour in the government of Gaston Flosse. He later served as Minister of Culture and the Environment. He resigned as a minister in August 1994 following a coalition realignment.

Plays
 1972: Te pe'ape'a hau 'ore o Papa Penu e o Mama Roro (The incessant arguments of Papa Penu and Mama Roro)
 1974: Te huno'a mana'o 'ore hia ("The Unexpected Son-in-Law")

Honours
In 1983 he was made a Chevalier of the Ordre national du Mérite. In 1989 he was made an officer.

In June 2000 he was appointed an Officer of the Order of Tahiti Nui.

In November 2016 Taunoa College was renamed as Maco Tevane College in his honour.

References

1937 births
2013 deaths
People from Papeete
Tahitian-language writers
French Polynesian academics
Ministers of Culture of French Polynesia
Here Ai'a politicians
Officers of the Order of Tahiti Nui
Officers of the Ordre national du Mérite
Members of the Tahitian Academy